The South American Men's Volleyball Club Championship is an international men's club volleyball competition organized by the Confederación Sudamericana de Voleibol (CSV), the sport's governing body in South America. The competition was first contested in 2009 in Florianópolis, Brazil and tournaments have been held every year since then.

In addition to crowning the South American champions, the tournament also serves as a qualifying tournament for the FIVB Volleyball Men's Club World Championship.

Results

Medals summary

Medal table by club

Medal table by country

MVP by edition
2009 –  Bruno Rezende (Florianópolis)
2010 –  Luciano de Cecco (Bolívar)
2011 –  Murilo Endres (SESI São Paulo)
2012 –  Evandro Guerra (Sada Cruzeiro)
2013 –  Demián González (UPCN San Juan)
2014 –  Wallace de Souza (Sada Cruzeiro)
2015 –  Nikolay Uchikov (UPCN San Juan)
2016 –  Yoandry Leal (Sada Cruzeiro)
2017 –  Yoandry Leal (Sada Cruzeiro)
2018 –  Robertlandy Simón (Sada Cruzeiro)
2019 –  Taylor Sander (Sada Cruzeiro)
2020 –  Fernando Kreling (Sada Cruzeiro)
2022 –  Miguel López (Sada Cruzeiro)

See also

 South American Women's Volleyball Club Championship

References

External links
CSV

 
 
International volleyball competitions
International men's volleyball competitions
Volleyball competitions in South America
Volleyball
Sports club competitions
Annual sporting events
2009 establishments in South America
Multi-national professional sports leagues